is a Japanese former football player who last played for Fujieda MYFC.

Club career
Naruoka played for Júbilo Iwata from 2003 to 2010 and joined Albirex Niigata in January 2013.

A skillful attacking midfielder possessing excellent technique he played in the same team as Japan National Team captain Makoto Hasebe while at Fujieda Higashi High School.

Naruoka retired in December 2019.

National team career
In September 2001, Naruoka was selected Japan U-17 national team for 2001 U-17 World Championship. He played all 3 matches. In November 2003, he was also selected Japan U-20 national team for 2003 World Youth Championship. He played all 5 matches.

Club statistics
Updated to 23 February 2020.

References

External links
 

Profile at Albirex Niigata

1984 births
Living people
Association football people from Shizuoka Prefecture
Japanese footballers
Japan youth international footballers
J1 League players
J2 League players
J3 League players
Júbilo Iwata players
Avispa Fukuoka players
Albirex Niigata players
SC Sagamihara players
Fujieda MYFC players
Association football midfielders